The Chinese government-in-exile may refer to:

Republic of China - governing entity of the Taiwan, Penghu, Kinmen, Matsu and other islands since 7 December 1949.
Political status of Taiwan
Treaty of Taipei